Born from Pain is a Dutch hardcore band from the Oostelijke Mijnstreek (as a part of the infamous M.O.C.) that formed in 1997.

Since they formed, they have achieved fame through energetic shows and grew out to become the international band they are today. They have toured Europe, the United States, Mexico and Japan. They have shared stages with bands such as Hatebreed, Madball, Zero Mentality, Six Feet Under, Soulfly, Agnostic Front and Slayer.

In March 2007, longtime frontman Che left the band due to personal reasons. He was temporarily replaced by Carl Schwartz, frontman of First Blood, and Scott Vogel from Terror. The band later found a full-time vocalist in Kevin Otto of German deathcore band 'End of Days'. But Otto struggled with his voice so he was replaced by bass player Rob Fransen. Andries Beckers of The Setup took over on bass. They are widely regarded as one of the premier European hardcore bands.

Members 
Current members
Rob Franssen – vocals
Dominik Stammen – guitar
Stefan van Neerven – guitar
Tommie Gawellek – bass guitar
Max van Winkelhof – drums

Former members
Ché Snelting – vocals 1997–2007
Servé Olieslagers – guitar
Marijn Moritz – guitar
Wouter Alers – drums
Pieter Hendriks – drums
Kevin Otto – vocals
Andries Beckers – bass guitar
Roy Moonen – drums
Karl Fieldhouse – guitar
Igor Wouters – drums
Roel Klomp – drums
Pete Gorlitz – bass

Discography

Studio albums 

2002: Reclaiming the Crown (Gang Style Records)
2003: Sands of Time (Gang Style Records)
2005: In Love With the End (Hollowman Records)
2006: War (Metal Blade Records)
2008: Survival (Metal Blade Records)
2012: The New Future (Gang Style Records)
2014: Dance With The Devil (BDHW Records)
2019: True Love (BDHW Records)

EP 
1999: Immortality (Gang Style Records)

References

External links 

Official website

Born From Pain Survival Review on The Daily Music Guide

Metal Blade Records artists
Dutch heavy metal musical groups
Musical groups established in 1997
Metalcore musical groups
Black Market Activities artists
Dutch hardcore punk groups
Dutch thrash metal musical groups
Musical quintets
Musical groups from Limburg (Netherlands)
Heerlen